An Xuyên Bakery is a bakery in Portland, Oregon.

Description 
An Xuyên Bakery is a French-Vietnamese bakery on Foster Road in southeast Portland's Foster-Powell neighborhood. The menu includes bánh mì, baked goods such as macarons, mooncake, and teacake, baozi, French bread, and pastries such as the Tiger Roll, a Swiss roll with a layer of pandan sponge cake and whipped cream. Bread for the bánh mì is baked on site daily. Ingredients include cucumbers, pickled carrot and daikon, cilantro, and jalapeños; other fillings include pâté, Vietnamese ham, chipotle chicken, lemongrass pork, tofu, and faux meat.

History 
The bakery was established in 1995. An Xuyên supplied bread to Baby Doll Pizza and Lardo, as of 2014. The restaurant Expatriate used butter rolls made by An Xuyên, as of 2021.

Reception 

In 2016, Lizzy Acker of Willamette Week said An Xuyên had "ridiculously affordable prices" and quipped, "You'll pay more in gas to get there than you will for a filling meal." In 2020, Krista Garcia and Alex Frane included the bakery in Eater Portland's lists of Portland's "top pandan treats" and 14 "excellent" sandwich shops in the city, respectively. Frane said An Xuyên "has quietly served some of the city's best bánh mì to a faithful crowd for years now". He also included the bakery in Thrillist's 2020 list of the best sandwiches in Portland. Garcia also included the business in Eater Portland 2021 list of 11 "big-deal" bánh mì in the city. Katrina Yentch included the restaurant in the website's 2022 list of "18 Knockout Spots for Affordable Dining in Portland".

See also

 List of bakeries
 List of French restaurants
 List of Vietnamese restaurants

References

External links

 

1995 establishments in Oregon
Bakeries of Oregon
Foster-Powell, Portland, Oregon
French restaurants in Portland, Oregon
Restaurants established in 1995
Vietnamese restaurants in Portland, Oregon